The Château de Fayolle is a château in Tocane-Saint-Apre, Dordogne, Nouvelle-Aquitaine, France.

Architecture
The castle, located in the west of the Dordogne department, consists of two parallel logis joined by lateral walls and terminated at each end by protruding pavilions It has been registered as a historical monument by the French Ministry of Culture since 1969.

History
The castle was attacked many times during the Hundred Years' War and in the 15th century was burned by the troops of the Lords of Bourdeille. The current castle is the result of two successive periods of re-construction, the first in 1766 under direction of the architect Chauvin and the second, at the end of the 19th century, is the work of the architect Léon Drouyn. The chapel which dates from this second phase houses the pectoral cross and chalice of the former abbot of Chancelade, Alain de Solminihac.

Gallery

References

Châteaux in Dordogne
Houses completed in 1766
Monuments historiques of Dordogne